Brzozowiec  (Berezovets’) is a village in the administrative district of Gmina Zagórz, within Sanok County, Subcarpathian Voivodeship, in south-eastern Poland.

The village has a population of 40.

References

Brzozowiec